A by-election for the constituency of St Pancras North in the United Kingdom House of Commons was held on 10 March 1949, caused by the resignation of the incumbent Labour MP George House. The result was a hold for the Labour Party, with their candidate Kenneth Robinson.

Result

Previous election

References

 Craig, F. W. S. (1983) [1969]. British parliamentary election results 1918-1949 (3rd edition ed.). Chichester: Parliamentary Research Services. . 
 

St Pancras North by-election
St Pancras North by-election
St Pancras North by-election
St Pancras North.1949
St Pancras North,1949